Rachel Marsden (born December 2, 1974) is a Canadian conservative political columnist, television commentator and university lecturer, based in Paris. She is also the CEO of Rachel Marsden Associates, a PR and media consultancy firm. As of March 2016, she hosts a French-language geopolitical talk show on Sputnik News from the network's Paris studio four times per week. As of 2020, she is also a nationally ranked competitive swimmer at the masters level in France in the 50m, 100m, 200m, 400m freestyle, 50m butterfly, and 200m individual medley and also in Canada.

In the 2000s, she was a columnist for publications such as the Toronto Sun
and Human Events magazine. Her column is currently syndicated by Tribune Publishing.

Early life and education
Marsden grew up in Port Coquitlam, British Columbia. As a high school student at Terry Fox Secondary in 1992, Marsden received a bronze Governor General's Academic Medal.

Marsden was inspired to go into journalism by listening to Canadian radio personality Jack Webster when she was growing up. In 2002, she took a political journalism training course at the National Journalism Center in Washington, DC.

Marsden graduated with a Bachelor of Science degree from Simon Fraser University (SFU) with a minor in French language. As an SFU student, Marsden came to public attention when she was at the centre of the Simon Fraser University 1997 harassment controversy, in which she and a swimming coach publicly accused each other of sexual harassment.
The coach was dismissed, then re-hired by the university after doubts were raised about the credibility of Marsden's accusations against him. Over ten years later, Marsden was interviewed by the university's newspaper and said of the events: "[The administration] were more interested in quelling negative PR than defending the truth. I was told by SFU to keep quiet and say nothing to the media. My only regret is that I listened to them."

Career

Marsden first broke into journalism in the early 2000s, writing for conservative web sites. In 2002, she worked for the Free Congress Foundation.

Before the 2004 federal election in Canada, she was hired under an alias by Gurmant Grewal, a Conservative member of the Parliament of Canada, to assist his constituency office with press releases, but was forced out when her identity was revealed by the press while her criminal charges were pending.

In 2005, she had a column at National Post for two months.
Later that year she was hired by the Toronto Sun as a weekly opinion columnist, and wrote for them until November 2007.
Her syndicated column has appeared in the online edition of The Daily Telegraph,
The Spectator, and Townhall.com, and reprinted a few times in Wall Street Journal and the New York Daily News.
In 2004 Marsden appeared as a guest on Dennis Miller Live. In 2005 she appeared twice as a guest panelist on The O'Reilly Factor on the Fox News Channel. Marsden appeared on the Fox News Channel until 2007.

In early 2007, she moved from Toronto to New York City.

In 2007, she was hired as one of five panelists on Red Eye w/ Greg Gutfeld,
a then new late-night talk show that began airing in February 2007 and worked there for five months. On May 30, 2007, Marsden was dismissed from Red Eye and escorted out of the Fox studio by security guards.  She explained that her departure was due to a change in the show's format, and that being escorted out was standard procedure. She appeared once in October 2007, as a guest panelist on CNN's The Situation Room. Marsden has been compared to Ann Coulter in opinion, presentation and appearance.

In 2009 Marsden moved to France, and since then she has been a regular panelist on LCP Politique Matin, carried on the state-owned parliamentary television channel La Chaîne parlementaire in France. She currently teaches some classes at Sciences Po as enseignante, or adjunct member of the teaching staff.

In November 2011, she self-published a novel, American Bombshell: A Tale of Domestic and International Invasion through Createspace.

Personal life
In 1997 Marsden came to public attention for her role in the Simon Fraser University 1997 harassment controversy.

In September 2007, a relationship between Marsden and an Ontario Provincial Police officer ended. She posted his photo and identified him on her blog as an anti-terrorism officer and wrote he had leaked secret anti-terrorism documents to her. The officer filed a complaint of harassment against Marsden, but this was later dropped. The OPP launched a separate internal investigation into the alleged conduct of the officer. His lawyer declared that he was cleared of any wrongdoing.

Marsden contacted Wikipedia co-founder Jimmy Wales in 2006 and said that her Wikipedia biography was libelous. Wales stated his involvement with her article was handled through the normal channels, and was "routine". He also says he "recused [himself] from any further official action", after their relationship became personal.
On February 29, 2008, the Gawker news and gossip blog Valleywag claimed Wales and Marsden had entered into a relationship, and published instant messaging chats they allegedly exchanged. On the following day, Wales announced on his Wikipedia user page that he had broken up with her. Marsden, who learned about the breakup by reading about it on Wikipedia, turned to eBay and put up a T-shirt and sweater for auction that she said belonged to Wales.

References

External links

 
 

 This article uses content licensed under the GFDL from deleted revisions of Wikipedia's article on Rachel Marsden. A list of previous authors of the page can be found at Talk:Rachel Marsden/GFDL History.

1974 births
Businesspeople from British Columbia
Canadian columnists
Canadian consultants
Canadian expatriates in France
Canadian political commentators
Canadian women academics
Canadian women in business
Canadian women journalists
Conservatism in Canada
Fox News people
Living people
National Post people
People from Port Coquitlam
Simon Fraser University alumni
Canadian women columnists
Canadian women non-fiction writers